Atlanta inclinata is a species of sea snail, a holoplanktonic marine gastropod mollusk in the family Atlantidae.

Distribution

Description 
The maximum recorded shell length is 7 mm.

Habitat 
Minimum recorded depth is 0 m. Maximum recorded depth is 150 m.

References

Atlantidae
Gastropods described in 1850
Taxa named by John Edward Gray